The 61st Yard is a CTA rail yard located in the Washington Park neighborhood on the South Side of Chicago, Illinois. It opened on January 22, 1893, as part of South Side Rapid Transit's expansion into Jackson Park. It is located along the Green Line of the Chicago Transit Authority and across 63rd Street from Lower 63rd Yard. It is currently used to store non-revenue and maintenance equipment.

References 

Chicago Transit Authority